Eupithecia blandula is a moth in the family Geometridae. It is found in Taiwan.

The wingspan is about 19–21 mm.

References

Moths described in 2007
blandula
Moths of Asia